Fluoropyrimidines are a class of anti-cancer drugs, or more specifically antimetabolites, and include:

 Capecitabine
 Carmofur (HCFU)
 Doxifluridine
 Fluorouracil (5-FU)
 Tegafur